The Pelorus-class cruiser was a "third-class" protected cruiser designed by Sir William White (Director of Naval Construction 1885 – 1902) for the Royal Navy, based on the earlier Pearl-class cruisers. Eleven ships were ordered to this design in 1893 under the Spencer Programme, and were laid down 1896–1900. The first, was commissioned in 1896.

Development and design

Most served in minor roles on overseas or colonial patrol work, not with the main battlefleets. They carried a complement of 224 and were armed with eight QF 4-inch (25 pounder) guns, eight 3 pounder guns, three machine guns, and two 18-inch (450-mm) torpedo tubes.

They had reciprocating triple expansion steam engines and were equipped with different types of boiler which were trialled in these cruisers. Some had Normand water-tube boilers which could give  for limited periods of time with forced draught and  under natural draught.

Ships in the class

Service
In an era of naval innovation, the class was almost outdated before they were launched. They were fitted with a variety of different boilers as a trial but most were not particularly satisfactory; so HMS Pandora was scrapped in 1913, HMS Perseus and HMS Prometheus in 1914. They had all been condemned in 1904 but had been reprieved. The remainder were to be scrapped in 1915, but were kept in service through the First World War. HMS Pegasus was sunk in combat in 1914, the rest - except for HMS Pioneer - were scrapped between 1919 and 1922. HMS Pactolus and HMS Pomone had Blechynden boilers which were particularly unreliable, they were removed from active service several years before others in the class.

Rear Admiral Cresswell, the 1st Naval Member of the Australian Naval Board described Psyche and Pyramus in 1914 as "the unspeakably useless P. class."

References

External links

Pelorus Class Battleships-Cruisers.co.uk
Pelorous Class Third Class Protected Cruisers worldwar1.co.uk

Cruiser classes
 
Ship classes of the Royal Navy